Doxogenes is a genus of moth in the family Lecithoceridae.

Species
 Doxogenes argyreodema Wu & Park, 1999
 Doxogenes brochias (Meyrick, 1905)
 Doxogenes ceraena Wu & Park, 1999
 Doxogenes ecliptica (Meyrick, 1908)
 Doxogenes henicosura Wu & Park, 1999
 Doxogenes phalaritis (Meyrick, 1905)
 Doxogenes philodoxa (Meyrick, 1908)
 Doxogenes pyrophanes (Meyrick, 1905)
 Doxogenes spectralis (Meyrick, 1905)
 Doxogenes thoracias (Meyrick, 1908)

References

Natural History Museum Lepidoptera genus database

 
Lecithocerinae
Moth genera